The Louisiade Plateau, also called the Louisiade Rise, is a poorly studied oceanic plateau in the northern Coral Sea of the South Pacific Ocean. It has been described as a continental fragment that rifted away from the northwestern continental margin of Australia but its position at the northern end of the Tasmantid Seamount Chain also suggests that the Louisiade Plateau might be a large igneous province formed by the arrival of the Tasmantid hotspot.

References

Plateaus of the Pacific Ocean
Coral Sea